Colerain Township is one of the sixteen townships of Ross County, Ohio, United States.  The 2000 census found 1,943 people in the township, 1,572 of whom lived in the unincorporated portions of the township.

Geography
Located in the northeastern corner of the county, it borders the following townships:
Salt Creek Township, Pickaway County - north
Perry Township, Hocking County - northeast corner
Salt Creek Township, Hocking County - east
Harrison Township - south
Springfield Township - southwest corner
Green Township - west
Pickaway Township, Pickaway County - northwest corner

Two populated places are located in northeastern Colerain Township: the village of Adelphi and the unincorporated community of Hallsville.

Name and history
Statewide, other Colerain Townships are located in Belmont and Hamilton counties.

Government
The township is governed by a three-member board of trustees, who are elected in November of odd-numbered years to a four-year term beginning on the following January 1. Two are elected in the year after the presidential election and one is elected in the year before it. There is also an elected township fiscal officer, who serves a four-year term beginning on April 1 of the year after the election, which is held in November of the year before the presidential election. Vacancies in the fiscal officership or on the board of trustees are filled by the remaining trustees.

References

External links
County website

Townships in Ross County, Ohio
Townships in Ohio